Hewitt is the name of some places in the U.S. state of Wisconsin:
Hewitt, Marathon County, Wisconsin, a town
Hewitt, Wood County, Wisconsin, a village